The Daily Prothom Alo is a daily newspaper in Bangladesh, published from Dhaka in the Bengali language. It is the largest circulated newspaper in Bangladesh. According to National Media Survey 2018, conducted by Kantar MRB Bangladesh, Prothom Alo has more than 6.6 million daily readership online. According to Alexa Internet, an American web traffic analysis company, the online portal of Prothom Alo is the most visited Bengal website in the world.

History

Prothom Alo was founded on 4 November 1998. The circulation of Prothom Alo grew from an initial circulation of 42,000 to a circulation of a half million copies. The newspaper distinguished itself by its investigations of acid attacks and violence against women and pushing for tougher laws against the sale of acid. From press facilities located in Dhaka, Chittagong and Bogra, around 5,00,000 copies (as of March ‘2014) are circulated each day. According to National Media Survey 2018, everyday 6.6 million people read the print edition of Prothom Alo. The claimed readership of the online and print edition of this newspaper is 7.6 million.

A senior reporter of Prothom Alo, Rozina Islam, was detained for 5 hours in Bangladesh Secretariat after she went there to cover the health ministry on 17 May 2021. A case was filed against her by an official of Health Service Division under the Official Secrets Act. After filing of the case she was taken to Shahbagh Police Station.
She was quizzed for 5 days in police remand.
She was released upon bail from Kashimpur prison on 23 May 2021.

Digital platforms
The online portal of Prothom Alo is the number 1 Bangladeshi website in the world. This portal is accessed by 1.6 million visitors from 200 countries and territories across the globe with 60 million pageviews per month. The e-paper site of Prothom Alo  is also the Number 1 e-paper Web site of Bangladesh.  From 160 countries, 465 thousand visitors access this website with more than 26 million page views per month. On average, each of the visitors stays for 20 minutes on this Web site. Based on Facebook fan following, Prothom Alo is one of the leading corporate houses in Bangladesh. Till November 2015, 6.75 Million people are following this newspaper through Facebook. This is the biggest FB Fan page for any organization in Bangladesh. Prothom Alos blog (www.prothom-aloblog.com) provides a well-moderated platform where thousands of bloggers share their constructive thoughts on various contemporary issues. Moreover, nearly 700 thousand of the Prothom Alo app for various digital and mobile platforms have been downloaded as of October 2013. Altogether, printed and digital versions of Prothom Alo are being read by 12 million people from Bangladesh and 200 other countries and territories in a month.

Editors

 Matiur Rahman is the chief editor of the newspaper. He received the Ramon Magsaysay Award in 2005 in the category of Journalism, Literature and Creative Communication Arts.

Mathematics Olympiad
Prothom Alo helped to popularise Mathematics in Bangladesh. It organized Mathematics Olympiad for the first time in Bangladesh in 2003. It is one of the main sponsors and the main organizer of Bangladesh Mathematics Olympiad.

Recognition
Prothom Alo has been carrying on a campaign against acid violence, drugs, HIV/AIDS, and religious terrorism. For his contribution to this fight, the Philippines-based Ramon Magsaysay Award Foundation has described editor Matiur Rahman as ‘the guiding force in the positive changes in society and culture’ and in 2005 honored him with a Magsaysay Award, which is considered to be the 'Nobel Prize of Asia'. Rahman donated the prize money in equal proportion to the three funds that the Prothom Alo Trust has set up to help and support acid-burnt women, anti-drug campaigns, and persecuted journalists.

Sister Concerns
Prothom Alo, which belongs to Mediastar Ltd., has the following sister concerns:
 ABC Radio FM 89.2: Commercial operation of ABC Radio FM 89.2 commenced from 7 January 2009. It is one of the most popular FM radio channels of Dhaka city. Besides Dhaka, it is also being aired from Chittagong and Cox's Bazar stations.
 Prothoma Prokashon : Prothoma Prokashon is a publication house that started its journey in 2008. This publication house has been highly praised by different quarters for its quality publication works. Prothoma Prokashon received awards from Bangla Academy in 2011, 2012 and 2013.
 Prothoma Boier Dunia: Prothoma Boier Dunia or Prothoma World of Books is a bookselling outlet with five stores in Dhaka, Chittagong and Rajshahi.
 Protichinta: Protichinta is a quarterly journal on social, economic, and political issues.
 Kishor Alo : Kishor Alo, a monthly magazine for youngsters, started its journey in October 2013. Stories, novels, poems, quizzes, magic, adventures, traveling, science, jokes, and many other interesting features are published in this colorful monthly magazine. Kishor Alo also has a large number of volunteers all over Bangladesh. 
 Biggan Chinta : Biggan Chinta a monthly magazine for science lovers, started its journey from October 2016. It contains science writings (mainly about astrophysics and environmental science), interviews with scientists, science fiction and many others.
 Chakri.com (former Prothom Alo Jobs): Chakri.com offers regular recruitment circulars and solutions, corporate training services, and career counseling.

Criticism
Prothom Alo is often criticized for its liberal attitude. A  cartoon by Arifur Rahman was published in Alpin about a joke partly related to religion, causing protests against the Newspaper. A subsequent order was given from the government to ban the supplement. The editor of the Prothom Alo acknowledged the gaffe. In a statement released by Prothom Alo, the editor of Alpin, Matiur Rahman, apologized, expressing regret for publishing the cartoon. The cartoonist was jailed for six months and two days, he was arrested 18 September 2007 and released 20 March 2008.

In 2012, a High Court bench issued an injunction on the publication of Humayun Ahmed's political fiction Deyal at daily Prothom Alos weekly Shahitto Samwiki on a Friday. The bench of Justice also asked the government and the writer to explain why they should not be directed to correct a part of the fiction for presenting a ‘distorted’ version of the assassination of the country's founding president Sheikh Mujibur Rahman and his minor son Sheikh Russel. The controversial part of the fiction was published by Bangla daily Prothom Alo in its 11 May issue. The chapters portrayed Khandker Moshtaque in a manner that he did not know about the killings beforehand.

See also
Banglanews24.com
Basic Ali (comic strip), a comic strip in the paper
Daily Naya Diganta
Jugantor
 The Daily Ittefaq
 List of newspapers in Bangladesh

References

External links

 

Bengali-language newspapers published in Bangladesh
Daily newspapers published in Bangladesh
Publications established in 1998
1998 establishments in Bangladesh
Newspapers published in Dhaka